This is a list of the mammal species recorded in the Azores Islands, Portugal. Except for marine mammals and two species of bats, the Azores were completely devoid of mammals prior to their discovery in the early 15th century. All other mammals in the islands are therefore introduced species.

The following tags are used to highlight each species' conservation status as assessed by the International Union for Conservation of Nature.

Order: Rodentia (rodents) 

Rodents make up the largest order of mammals, with over 40% of mammalian species. They have two incisors in the upper and lower jaw which grow continually and must be kept short by gnawing.

Suborder: Myomorpha
Family: Muridae (mice and rats)
Subfamily: Murinae
Genus: Mus
 House mouse, Mus musculus 
Genus: Rattus
 Brown rat, Rattus norvegicus  introduced
 Black rat, Rattus rattus  introduced

Order: Erinaceomorpha (hedgehogs and gymnures) 

The order Erinaceomorpha contains a single family, Erinaceidae, which comprise the hedgehogs and gymnures. The hedgehogs are easily recognised by their spines while gymnures look more like large rats.

Family: Erinaceidae (hedgehogs)
Subfamily: Erinaceinae
Genus: Erinaceus
 European hedgehog, E. europaeus

Order: Chiroptera (bats) 

The bats' most distinguishing feature is that their forelimbs are developed as wings, making them the only mammals capable of flight. Bat species account for about 20% of all mammals.

Family: Vespertilionidae (mouse-eared bats)
Subfamily: Myotinae
Genus: Myotis
 Greater mouse-eared bat, Myotis myotis 
Subfamily: Verpertilioninae
Genus: Nyctalus
 Azores noctule, Nyctalus azoreum

Order: Cetacea (whales) 

The order Cetacea includes whales, dolphins and porpoises. They are the mammals most fully adapted to aquatic life with a spindle-shaped nearly hairless body, protected by a thick layer of blubber, and forelimbs and tail modified to provide propulsion underwater. Many species of cetaceans reproduce around the Azores.

Suborder: Mysticeti
Family: Balaenidae
Genus: Eubalaena
 North Atlantic right whale, Eubalaena glacialis 
Family: Balaenopteridae (rorquals)
Genus: Balaenoptera
 Northern minke whale, Balaenoptera acutorostrata 
 Sei whale, Balaenoptera borealis 
 Blue whale, Balaenoptera musculus 
 Fin whale, Balaenoptera physalus 
Genus: Megaptera
 Humpback whale, Megaptera novaeangliae 
Suborder: Odontoceti
Family: Delphinidae (dolphins and pilot whales)
Genus: Globicephala
 Short-finned pilot whale, Globicephala macrorhyncus 
 Long-finned pilot whale, Globicephala melas 
Genus: Grampus
 Risso's dolphin, Grampus griseus 
Genus: Orcinus
 Killer whale, Orcinus orca 
Genus: Stenella
 Striped dolphin, Stenella coeruleoalba 
 Atlantic spotted dolphin, Stenella frontalis 
Genus: Tursiops
 Common bottlenose dolphin, Tursiops truncatus 
Family: Kogiidae (small sperm whales)
Genus: Kogia
 Pygmy sperm whale, Kogia breviceps 
 Dwarf sperm whale, Kogia sima 
Family: Physeteridae (sperm whales)
Genus: Physeter
 Sperm whale, Physeter macrocephalus 
Family: Ziphiidae (beaked whales)
Genus: Hyperoodon
 Northern bottlenose whale, Hyperoodon ampullatus 
Genus: Mesoplodon
 Sowerby's beaked whale, Mesoplodon bidens 
 Blainville's beaked whale, Mesoplodon densirostris 
 Gervais' beaked whale, Mesoplodon europaeus 
 True's beaked whale, Mesoplodon mirus 
Genus: Ziphius
 Cuvier's beaked whale, Ziphius cavirostris

Order: Carnivora (carnivorans) 

There are over 260 species of carnivorans, the majority of which feed primarily on meat. They have a characteristic skull shape and dentition.

Suborder: Caniformia
Family: Mustelidae (mustelids)
Genus: Mustela
 Least weasel, Mustela nivalis 
Family: Phocidae (earless seals)
Genus: Monachus
 Mediterranean monk seal, Monachus monachus

Notes

References
 Aulagnier, S. et al. (2008) Guide des mammifères d'Europe, d'Afrique du Nord et de Moyen-Orient. Delachaux et Niestlé, Paris
 Shirihai, H. & Jarrett, B. (2006) Whales, Dolphins and Seals: A Field Guide to the Marine Mammals of the World. A & C Black, London

See also
List of chordate orders
Lists of mammals by region
List of prehistoric mammals
Mammal classification
List of mammals described in the 2000s

 
Mammals
Azores
Azores